The British Motor Corporation's Mini has been used as the basis for numerous kit cars and specials.  Some are designed to look like the rare Mini Moke.  Below is a partial list. There may be duplicates in this list as several cars emerged more than once from companies under different ownership.

Australia
BROADSPEED (BRIAN FOLEY MOTORS) Sports GT
Bulanti MINI Sports GT
DES HIGGINS MOTORBODIES Ecurie-Dedez Mini GT
LOLITA AUTOMOBILE DEVELOPMENTS Sports MK1, Racer MK2
NOTA Engineering, Nota Fang Sports
Pellandini Cars
PROJECT-X Sports GT
S&A Minisprint (Stewart & Ardern Coachworks) S&A Mini Sprint GT 
TAYLORSPEED Minijem Sports GT

Belgium
MÉAN Sonora GT

Canada 
REPTUNE Sports GT

Denmark 
SEKURA Coupe Sports

France 
Automobiles Chatenet CH26
HRUBON Phaeton
HRUBON La Puce & Schmitt Funcars
SIMCA Barquette 1300 GTR

Germany 
COMminiCATION Elektrofahrzeuge GmbH (Mini based Electric Cars) MINI Convertible 
MARTINI MOTORSPORT Coupe GT
WESTWOOD ENGINEERING Mini-Moke replica

Italy
CAGIVA Mini Moke 1000 (1980s-1990s)
ESAP Minimach GT
 Innocenti 90L and 120L
INNOCENTI Mini Mare
MICHELOTTI Coachworks Mini
PININFARINA ADO-34 GT
ZAGATO Minigatto Sports GT

Malaysia
Morris Harimau

New Zealand
De Joux MINI GT
IBIS ENGINEERING Convertible

Portugal 
AURORA-BMC 1300 GT Racecar
IMA Austin Mini-Moke 1100
IMA 1000 Mini-Van, Mini-IMA Estate

South Africa 
BANSHEE Cooper Targa 
JACKSON Sportster Cabriolet

Switzerland 
HOLINGER-SOLAR Mini Evergreen Cabriolet

United Kingdom
356 SPORTS LIMITED Sprint Convertible, Sprint Coupe
ABC Tricar
(Built from 1968 to 1975 by Auto Bodycraft Conversions: William (Bill) Powell & Ken Heather at the Pensnett Trading Estate, Kingswinford, Staffordshire)
ABS MOTORSPORT Sprint GT Peel Viking replicas
AC Donington and Grand Prix
ALTO Duo
ANDERSEN MOTOR CO Cub
ASP 1300S racing car
AURORA (GEAR & RACING LTD) 1100 Race car
AUTOCARS Marcos
AUTOCOM Minibuggy
BAL Salamander Roadster
BANHAM CONVERSIONS Sprint
BARRIAN CARS LTD Stimson Safari Six Funcars
BERKELEY CARS Bandini Cabriolet
BIOTA Sports GT MK1 & MK2
BIRCHALL AUTOMOTIVE McCoy GT
BORO Sports GT
BROADSPEED Sports GT
BUTTERFIELD Engineering, Butterfield Musketeer GT
ONYX CARS Bobcat Buggy
BOXER CARS Sports
BROOKLANDS Swallow 3 wheeler
Brookwell Trifid
BUFI Mowog
CAMAROTTA Convertible
CAMBER CARS LTD/CHECKPOINT LIMITED Camber Sports GT
CAPRICORN Willys-Jeep lookalike
CAVALLO CARS LTD Cavallo Estivo GT
CHRISTOPHER Mini Cabriolet
CJC Bison Sports GT
CIRRUS Buggy
CODFORD Sports GT
COLDWELL Sports GT
COOPER-Bertone Mini 1100
COSTIN Targa Sports GT
COX & CO LTD, COX-GTM Sports
CRAYFORD Mini Convertible
Curley trike
D.A.R.T. or DART Sports GT
DAVENPORT Sports GT
Davrian Sports MK7 & Sports MK8
Deep Sanderson 105 Racecar & 301 Sports GT
DOUGAL Bug Open buggy
DRAGSPORT CARS LTD Sarcon Scarab Sports GT
ELSWICK Envoy Citycar
ERA Mini Turbo GT
EUXTON Caraboot Special
FELLPOINT LIMITED MINIJEM MK2/MK3 Sports GT
FIREBALL Midget Racer
FLETCHER Sports GT
FOERS Nomad Utility & Triton Estate
FRA ENGINEERING LTD Sports GT
FRENETTE CARS Californian 1100
ABS Freestyle
AUTOBARN Gecko
GITANE Sports GT
GNAT CARS Sports
GOA CARS
GT EQUIPMENT COMPANY Minisprint saloon, Walker-GTR
GTM (was Cox GTM)
Heinz 57 Crayford Convertible
ASD Hobo buggy
HOLLIER Mosquito Buggy
HOOPER Mini Estate Ambulances
HUFFAKER-BMC 1100 Racing car
Hustler (see also William Towns)
JEDI Stiletto Racing car
JIFFY Pickup Truck
JIMINI AUTOMOBILE CO LTD Funcars
JKD Austin-Mini Racing car
KAIG Funcars
KILLEEN K16 Sports
KINGFISHER MOTORS LTD, Sprint GT
LAMBERT Mokette Funcar
LANDAR COMPONENTS LTD R6 /R7 Racing cars
LAWTHER Sports GT
Leonhardt Tiger (A mid engine 1990s modern Messerschmitt KR200 replica kitcar)
LIGHTSPEED-PANELS Magenta
SELF-FIT Lunabug Buggy
HOMEBUILTS Lynx Estate
MACINTOSH DESIGN LTD M1/M2/M3 Sports
MAGUIRE Clubman GT
MALLOCK MK14 Racing car
Many Mego
MARCOS CARS LTD Mini Marcos GT MK Series
MARCOS HERITAGE LIMITED Mini Marcos GT
MAYA Sports GT
McCoy
Microdot
METRON Sports GTR 1300
MG Wasp Sports GT
MICRON CARS LTD Sports GT
Midas Bronze & Gold
MIDTEC Sports GT
MINETTE CARS Citycar
Mini Beach Car
IGM Mini Bug
Mini Daly Runabout
Mini Jaba
JEM CARS Mini Jem GT, Estate
Mini Landrover Estate
ASD Minim
Mini Marcos
Mini Scamp
Minissima
MINNOW (Coachbuilders) Estate
MINUS CARS WK LTD Maxi Estate & Minus Mini
MOKO
MOORLAND MK1 Racing car
Mosquito
NAUTICA Elf GTR 4WD Rover-Engined
LANGRIDGE ENGINEERING Navajo Utility
NCF MOTORS LTD Blitz Buggies
NERUS Sports GTR
NIFTY CARS Estate 1100
NIMBUS-COOPER BMC DPS (Don Parker Special)
NIMBUS CARS Coupe Sports
NOOVOH DEVELOPMENTS Stimson buggies & cars
TACCO Nimrod Buggy
NORTHLIGHT K4 Sports GT
NOSTALGIA CARS LTD NC 1000, NC 1100 GT, NC 1300 GTR
NOTA ENGINEERING UK LTD (1970s) Fang Cabriolet
Ogle SX1000
OYLER Coachworks Contessa
PENN GARAGE-FELLPOINT Minijem GT MK1
Peel Viking
PHOENIX AUTOMOTIVE Clubman Estate
PRIMO DESIGNS LTD GTM Coupe, GTM Cabriolet
UNIVERSAL POWER DRIVES LTD Quasar-Unipower Cube car
RADFORD Coachworks Mini Deville
RANGER MOTOR CO Cub Utility
REEVES Matrix 3 wheeler
RIDGWAY Scorpion GT
ROAMER Utility
RSR (Rally Sport Replicas) Austin Sprite Frogeye, Mini-Moke
SCAMP RTV 4X4
SCAMP MOTOR CO Utility models
SABRE CARS Sports
SABRINA Roadster 1100
SAGA Sports GT
SARCON LIMITED Whippingham Wrogue Racecar
AEM Scout
SEAGULL CARS Roadster
SHIKARI CARS Safari Funcars
SIVA ENGINEERING Mini buggy
SIVA MOTOR CO Mule Funcar
SILHOUETTE RACING Sports GT
SKIP 1000 3-wheeler
LIGHTSPEED-PANELS Sprint Cabriolet
STATUS MOTOR COMPANY/BRIAN LUFF LTD Symbol Cabriolet, Sabot Convertible & 365 Saloon
STIMSON CARS/BARRY STIMSON DESIGN Buggies & Funcars
TH ENGINEERING LTD Freestyle Buggy
TERRAPIN RACING LTD Terrapin
TICI SALES LTD TiCi City car
TIGER Wheeler Sports GT
TIMEIRE Sports GTR
TMC Scout
ONYX CARS Tomcat Buggy
INTERSTYL TXC Tracer Cabriolet
Triad
Trimin
TRIMINI Cabriolet 3 wheeler
TRIAD Mosquito 3 wheeler
TRIO BMC 3 wheeler
Twini
UNIVERSAL POWER DRIVES LTD Unipower GT
VIKING PERFORMANCE LTD Peel Sports GT
Westfield TRZ
WHITBY ENGINEERING Mini-Warrior
Mini Wildgoose
WOOD & PICKETT Coachbuilt Minis
WYNES-BIRCHALL McCoy Sports
GRANTURA Yak

United States
SURFITE Buggy

Venezuela
 Facorca Minicord

In early 1990 in Facorca (Fábrica de Motores y Carrocerías Cordillera) in the factory located on Mariara (Carabobo State, Venezuela), have the idea of building Minis made of Fiber-Glass is gestated.

After more than a year, in April 1990 an agreement is reached with RoverGroup Ltd. to obtain support, technical supervision, and to provide all the mechanical parts as well as all electric components, Facorca would assume the body, interior trim, radiator, radio, wheels, and tires. The factory molds itself for a maximum production of 10 cars per day, but the normal production would eventually become of 6 cars per day.

In December 1991, the series production commences, assembling total of 113 Mini Cord on that month. Two basic models with 1000cc enter the market (the project of launching a 1275cc engine was never achieved): The Mini Cord FA, deluxe version, which brought amongst other things, air conditioning, complete leather interior trim, central console with tachometer, chrome bumpers, spotlights,  Minilite Type GB wheels ; and the SB Mini Cord, Standard Version, with cloth interior trim, and steel wheels with deluxe wheel cups. All Colombian versions came with  Minilite type GB wheels.
In 1992 768 Mini Cords were produced, specifically for the Colombia, Venezuela, and Antilles market, of which 164 were imported to Colombia. That was the best year of production.

If you visit the BMIHT museum (British Motor Industry Heritage Trust) you'll be able to find, in a privileged place, amidst the most important Minis, a Red Mini Cord FA, with white roof.

By 1993, a few improvements are made to both models, changing the interior trim to a better one, much more comfortable, original Rover rearview mirrors, and new design on the forward emblem.

The 1993 Production descends to 391 units, due to the different economical problems, and problems among the partners, which drive the Factory to an almost decisive shut down. 62 Units are officially imported to Colombia, and the Distributors in Colombia, Mini City, cease to function as well.

In 1994 it found itself in a very difficult financial situation, but the success in sales and of possible exportations to Colombia take the company to the hands of Abisaad Janna & Cia, to which become convinced (by the partners left at Facorca) to re-open production.

Projects of assembling Mini Cords restart, and two Beach Minis prototypes get to be built first, two unique convertibles, a conventional Mini with Kit Cooper 1.0 with 10-inch wheels, and another standard engine and Pilmico Style.

Together with those, the Mini Cord with John Cooper 1.0 Kit deluxe is launched, with 13 inch Revolution wheels, Three-Clock-Central Drive Board, and Leather Interior. All should have been silver, although, because of special requests, some were painted otherwise, on other colors.

The total production with Cooper and the standard versions by 1994 was of 24 units a great deal of these series reach Colombia, and all this due to the Economical situation of Facorca. This takes Abisaad Jana & Cia, to cancel their contract.

In 1995 only 16 units are assembled and commences the dismantling the installations.

Between the years 1991 and 1995, only 1310 Mini Cord were produced, in the standard and the Deluxe Version, Cooper and Convertibles, which takes it to be the smallest or at least of the smallest Mini Productions of a Mini ever.

Notes

Mini
Mini (marque)